Datta Dalvi, an Indian politician from the Shiv Sena political party was the Mayor of Mumbai from 2005 to 2007. Until then, he served as a corporator in the Mumbai municipal corporation for three successive terms.

References 

Mayors of Mumbai
Living people
Shiv Sena politicians
Marathi politicians
Maharashtra local politicians
Year of birth missing (living people)